Douglas Township is a township in Madison County, Iowa, in the United States.

History
Douglas Township was organized in 1861.

References

Townships in Madison County, Iowa
Townships in Iowa
1861 establishments in Iowa